Imtiyaz Ahmed (born 10 November 1985), also spelled as Imtiaz Ahmed, is an Indian first-class cricketer who plays for Uttar Pradesh in domestic cricket. He is a right-arm fast-medium bowler. He was part of the Pune Warriors squad in 2011 for the Indian Premier League. He was signed by the Chennai Super Kings in 2013.

References

External links 

1985 births
Living people
Indian cricketers
Uttar Pradesh cricketers
Central Zone cricketers
Chennai Super Kings cricketers
People from Bhadohi district